Lee James Taylor White CBE (born 26 July 1965), is a British-Gabonese conservationist currently serving as the Minister of Water, Forests, the Sea and Environment of Gabon since 2019. He has worked in the fields related to climate change, the preservation and management of natural resources, protected areas and ecotourism. White has been tasked with managing deforestation and illegal logging and the country's population of African Forest Elephants. White has overseen the creation of Gabon's carbon credits program in 2022.

White was quoted by the New York Times as saying that without countries like Gabon leading in conservation as "examples of countries where we are solving the problems, then who is anyone else going to learn from?"

He was appointed CBE in the 2010 Birthday Honours.

References 

Gabonese politicians
British conservationists
Commanders of the Order of the British Empire
Living people
1965 births